Lyman Woodard (March 3, 1942 – February 25, 2009) was a Detroit-based jazz organist known for fusing his music with Latin and Afro-Cuban-inspired rhythms. From the late 1960s, Woodard recorded with Motown acts, and served as musical director for Martha and the Vandellas. But releases – such as his 1975 Saturday Night Special – and his namesake outfit, the Lyman Woodard Organization, were in the jazz-funk idiom.

Before establishing the Lyman Woodard Organization, he comprised a jazz trio with drummer Melvin Davis and guitarist Dennis Coffey; the ensemble performed numerous shows at a nightclub called Cobb's Corner. In 1968, Woodard and Melvin Davis recorded the album Hair And Thangs with Dennis Coffey. Although the album was released as a solo project by Dennis Coffey in 1969, a single containing "It's Your Thing" ("It's Your Thang" on the LP) and "River Rouge" was released with the artist(s) as "Dennis Coffey and the Lyman Woodard Trio". In 1979, Woodard returned to Cobb's Corner with the Organization to record Don't Stop the Groove, for the Corridor label. The 1987 recording, Dedicacion, featured violinist Regina Carter.

In March 2009, Wax Poetics Records reissued a limited pressing of Saturday Night Special as a double LP on 180-gram vinyl.

Discography
Live at J.J's lounge - 1974Saturday Night Special (Strata Records, 1975)Don't Stop the Groove (Corridor, 1979)Dedicacion (Corridor, 1987)74/93 Live At Last ! (Uuquipleu, 1993)Live at the 1996 Ford Montreux Detroit Jazz Festival (Corridor, 1996)with Robert Tye Virtues of the Well'' (Corridor, 1998)

References

1942 births
2009 deaths
American jazz organists
American male organists
American jazz pianists
American male pianists
Jazz-funk organists
Jazz-blues organists
20th-century American pianists
20th-century organists
20th-century American male musicians
American male jazz musicians